Zavodske is an urban-type settlement in the Chortkiv Raion (district) of Ternopil Oblast (province) in western Ukraine. It hosts the administration of Zavodske settlement hromada, one of the hromadas of Ukraine. Population:

History 
The settlement was built on the site of the village of Lipniki at the same time as the construction of the Chortkiv Sugar Plant.

Zavodske was established as an urban-type settlement in 1981.

Its population was 3,087 as of the 2001 Ukrainian Census.

References

Urban-type settlements in Chortkiv Raion
Populated places established in 1981
Chortkiv Raion
Zavodske settlement hromada